José Luis Cuciuffo (1 February 1961 – 11 December 2004) was an Argentine professional footballer who played as a centre back and who was part of the 1986 FIFA World Cup title-winning Argentina national team.

Club career
Cuciuffo started his professional career at Chaco For Ever, and later played for Talleres de Córdoba, Vélez Sársfield, Boca Juniors and Belgrano de Córdoba. He also played in the French league with Nîmes Olympique.

Death
Cuciuffo suffered a fatal gunshot wound in the stomach while out hunting in the southern Buenos Aires province, near San Blas Bay.

Honours
Boca Juniors
 Supercopa Sudamericana: 1989

Argentina
 FIFA World Cup: 1986

References

External links

1961 births
2004 deaths
Footballers from Córdoba, Argentina
Argentine people of Italian descent
Association football defenders
Argentine footballers
Argentina international footballers
1986 FIFA World Cup players
1987 Copa América players
1989 Copa América players
FIFA World Cup-winning players
Boca Juniors footballers
Talleres de Córdoba footballers
Club Atlético Vélez Sarsfield footballers
Nîmes Olympique players
Club Atlético Belgrano footballers
Deaths by firearm in Argentina
Hunting accident deaths
Firearm accident victims
Accidental deaths in Argentina
Argentine Primera División players
Ligue 1 players
Expatriate footballers in France
Argentine expatriate sportspeople in France
Argentine expatriate footballers